Weizer Building may refer to:

Weizer Building (8935 Buckeye Road, Cleveland, Ohio), listed on the National Register of Historic Places (NRHP)
Weizer Building (11801 Buckeye Road, Cleveland, Ohio), also listed on the NRHP